The 1982 Ometepec earthquake that struck Mexico's southwestern coast near Ometepec (Guerrero) on 7 June was a doublet earthquake that ruptured in two steps. The first happened at 06:52 UTC, the second five hours later at 10:59 UTC. Estimated magnitudes are 6.9 and 7.0 on the  scale, and 5.8 and 6.0 on the  scale. The maximum Mercalli intensities were VII and VIII, respectively.

Mexico's southwestern coast is parallel to the  Middle America Trench (MAT), where the oceanic Cocos plate (a remnant of the ancient Farallon plate) is being subducted under the North American plate, resulting in many major earthquakes. Most earthquakes observed in this region are similar to earthquakes seen at other subduction zones, but in the vicinity of Ometepec they tend to occur as doublets. This earthquake is unique in being (circa 2013) the "best documented doublet and for which near and teleseismic data are available", and has been extensively studied.

The interruption of the main rupture that results in a doublet earthquake has been attributed to "asperities", patches in the fault where harder rock resists immediate rupture. However, study of this earthquake's aftershocks shows a discontinuity in their spatial distribution. This has been interpreted as indicating a split in the subducting plate, where the plate is subducting at slightly different down angles on either side of the split.

Notes

Sources 
 
 
 
 
 .

 .

 .

See also 
 

1982 earthquakes
Earthquakes in Mexico